Kwon Kwang-il (born 9 May 1990) is a North Korean sport shooter.

He participated at the 2018 ISSF World Shooting Championships, winning a medal.

References

External links

Living people
1990 births
North Korean male sport shooters
Running target shooters
Shooters at the 2018 Asian Games
Asian Games competitors for North Korea